Goalscape is a commercially licensed visual information management software application. Initially used in Olympics, Goalscape has a patented user interface which displays the information hierarchy as a multi-level pie chart. For management of a goal-oriented activity, Goalscape puts the core goal at the center and comes with all the sub-goals and tasks grouped around it. Their size represents their relative importance, and shading indicates progress. The software includes a Focus feature that allows a user to filter goals by priority.

Goalscape can be used to implement management methods such as Objectives and Key Results,  and Management by Objectives or Management by Goals.

Goalscape is a cross-platform application that is delivered as a web application that runs on all major web browsers for online access and project collaboration.

Uses
 Goal visualization and management
 Project management
 Management with Objectives and Key Results
 Organizational Management
 Agile Management
 Strategic planning
 Creating and documenting a variety of hierarchical structures

References

External links
Official Goalscape website

Task management software